Lakhbir Singh Lodhinangal is an Indian politician who was the member of Punjab Legislative Assembly for two terms between 2007-2012 and 2017-2022. He is a member of the Shiromani Akali Dal.

Political career
He served as Sarpanch of his village for 30 years. Then for first time he was elected from Qadian in 2007 and then he contested from Batala in 2012 but lost to Ashwani Sekhri, then again contested from Batala in 2017 and won. He is the first Akali MLA from Batala.

References

1950 births
Living people
Punjab, India MLAs 2007–2012
Shiromani Akali Dal politicians
Punjab, India MLAs 2017–2022